Femm-Isation is the debut studio album by Japanese musical duo Far East Mention Mannequins, who later adapted their name into FEMM. It was released as an independent digital album on October 1, 2014 by Maximum10 and Avex Music Creative Inc. After releasing a digital EP Astroboy in April 2014, Avex announced new material from the group. The album's production was handled by several music producers and songwriters, such as Dan Book, Alexei Misoul, Leah Haywood, Daniel James, Kevin Ross, Andreas Carlsson, and Dreamlab. It also features a guest appearance from FEMM's alter-egos; the managers Honey-B and W-Trouble. Performed in English language, Femm-Isation is primarily an electronic dance album with numerous elements of pop ballad, disco, and eurodance.

Upon its release, Femm-Isation was met with generally positive reviews from music critics, many of whom complimented the commercial appeal of the songs and group, and praised the lyrical and musical delivery. However, some critics singled out some tracks that weren't good. Commercially, Femm-Isation was unsuccessful. The album failed to chart on the Japanese Oricon Albums Chart due to their policy of restricting digital sales and releases, and failed to chart on any Japanese Billboard albums charts. The album managed to chart for a sole week on the US Billboard World Albums Chart at 10.

Femm-Isation spawned thirteen promotional singles, and eight digital singles. Despite no chart positions, the singles: "Kill the DJ" and "Fxxk Boyz Get Money" achieved viral status because of the song's musical and lyrical delivery, along with its music video aesthetics. Because of this, several online figures and websites begun spreading the songs and the group virally. FEMM promoted the album on several live performances and concert gigs. In February 2016, Femm-Isation will be re-released physically as a double album with the group's subsequent release P.o.W.!/LCS (2016).

Background and development
Far East Mention Mannequins, which consists of Japanese–American model and actress Emily Kaiho, and Japanese singer Hiro Todo, premiered their musical debut in October 2013 with a YouTube video about two Japanese "mannequins" roaming the streets of Shibuya and Tokyo city; they were subsequently hired by Maximum10, a sub-division label from Avex Music Creative Inc. As part of their character development, where Kaiho and Todo portray the mannequins RiRi and LuLa respectively, FEMM's label approach and background is unknown. As a result, two new alter-egos, "agents", were made to represent the group; Kaiho as Honey-B and Todo as W-Trouble; Honey-B and W-Trouble are present on the album respectively with RiRi and LuLa.

They released their first extended play with Avex exclusively, Astroboy through digital stores on April 2, 2014. Due to positive reaction, Avex hired several producers and songwriters to create songs for the group's debut studio album, such as Dan Book, Alexei Misoul, Leah Haywood, Daniel James, Kevin Ross, Andreas Carlsson, and Dreamlab. FEMM begun recording the album at Avex Studios and Prime Sound Studios in Japan around at the start of 2014 with Hideaki Jinbu, and the album's material was finalized and mixed by Tom Coyne at Sterling Studios in New York City, New York.

Composition
Femm-Isation is primarily an electronic dance album with numerous elements of rap, synthpop, and J-pop. EDM is the most prominent element in the songs, which include "We Flood the Night", "Kill the DJ", "Party All Night", "White Noise", "Wannabe", and "Whiplash". Other tracks have elements of different musical genres; R&B in "The Real Thing", dancehall in "Dead Wrong", and pop ballad melodies through "Unbreakable". Corynn Smith from MTV Iggy labelled some tracks; "A romantic trance trip a la (We Flood the Night), craving a techno remix of '70s J-pop hit (UFO), or in a twerk-tastic, rubber-maid-outfit-clad (Fxxk Boyz Get Money) kinda mood." Femm-Isation is recognized as the first J-pop album, released through Avex, to have been entirely recorded in English language. According to FEMM, both members did not yet have any professional experience in singing. The duo stated that the first time recording and appearing in a music video for "Astroboy" as their agents was challenging.

Release
Femm-Isation was released digitally on October 1, 2014 by Maximum10 and Avex Music Creative Inc. The digital album consists of thirteen tracks; "Astroboy" from their self-titled EP was included on the album. However, "UFO" from the EP did not. The cover sleeve immolates the music video to their single "Wannabe"; it features FEMM with gas masks on, holding up a flag that bears the title "Far East Mention Mannequins". That same year on December 24, Avex Music Creative Inc. released the instrumental version of the album. The digital album consists of thirteen instrumental tracks. The cover sleeve is an inverted version of the original album. On December 11, 2015, FEMM announced the release of a new extended play entitled PoW!/LCS as their major debut through Avex Trax and JPU Records. FEMM confirmed that two formats would be released; a separate EP format, and a double album that includes a physical copy of Femm-Isation. The third format, the EP and a blank CD-R disc, will be released so audiences who purchased the digital release of Femm-Isation can burn it on the disc. The double album will be released worldwide as a digital release on February 3, 2016, whilst the physical release will be released on February 24 that same year.

Critical and commercial responses

Femm-Isation received positive reviews from most music critics. Andy Malt from Complete Music Update was positive towards the tracks; he stated "Thankfully, the musical side makes more sense. Over the last seven months they’ve released fourteen globally-minded pop tracks onto YouTube, all of which make up their debut album, Femm-Isation, which will be released internationally on iTunes tomorrow. Tracks like 'Fuck Boyz Get Money' (a satire of The Notorious B.I.G. line, “fuck bitches, get money”) and my personal favourite, 'Wannabe' (not a Spice Girls cover)." Greg Hignight from J-Generation.com was very positive towards the songs on the album, and stated "My pick for the J-Pop album of 2014 is Femm-Isation, a celebration of the artificial aspiring for something more genuine, and in the process, delivering some the most exciting and original music to come out of the Japanese pop scene in years." Despite not reviewing the album, Molly Osbery from Vice.com was  praised the producers and songwriters from their material for being hidden pioneers in order to popularize the group, as she felt producers now were more "the front men". Despite not reviewing the album, Corynn Smith from MTV Iggy was impressed by their English language skills of the singles, and commended majority of the album's composition and singles. That same year, MTV Iggy listed FEMM as their "Artist to Watch".

Because it was released digitally, Femm-Isation failed to chart on the Japanese Oricon Albums Chart due to their policy of restricting digital sales and releases, and failed to chart on any competent Billboard Japan album chart. However, Femm-Isation managed to chart for a sole week on the US Billboard World Albums Chart at 10; this is FEMM's first charting effort from their discography as of January 2016, and were the second Japanese artist after Shintaro Sakamoto on the chart week of October 18, 2014.

Promotion

Album and remix singles

"Wannabe" was released as the album's lead single on April 16, 2014. Despite its release, the song failed to enter any music charts. Two accompanying music videos were shot for the single; one featured FEMM being sprayed painted to immolate body art in the middle of a street, while the second video featured FEMM dancing to the song in a white studio. "Kiss the Rain" was released as the album's second single on April 30, 2014. Despite its release, the song failed to enter any music charts. An accompanying music video was shot for the single; its features FEMM inside a steam punk environment dancing the song. Intercut scenes feature FEMM kissing each other and dancing in front of computer generated imagery. "White Noise" was released as the album's third single on May 7, 2014. Despite its release, the song failed to enter any music charts. An accompanying music video was shot for the single; its features FEMM dancing to the video, and performing in latex body suits. The video is primarily made with lyric video scenes, computer generated imagery, and scenes of FEMM dancing. "We Flood the Night" was released as the album's fourth single on May 14, 2014. Despite its release, the song failed to enter any music charts. An accompanying music video was shot for the single; its features FEMM as mannequin dolls, traveling through a city and underwater world.

"Kill the DJ" was released as the album's fifth single on May 28, 2014. The song received favorable reviews from most music critics, many whom praised the song's production and composition.  Despite its release, the song failed to enter any music charts. An accompanying music video was shot for the single; its features RiRi and LuLa in a cadet and nurse uniform, dancing and fighting to the song. The video received a large amount of favourable feedback, praising the concept, its convenient use of cosplay and otaku culture, and choreography. "Fxxk Boyz Get Money" was released as the album's sixth single on July 30, 2014. The song was critically acclaimed from many music critics, many whom praised the song's commercial nature and lyrical message. Despite its release, the song failed to enter any music charts. An accompanying music video was shot for the single; its features FEMM singing and twerking in an overlapped lyric video. The video received a large amount of favourable feedback, and attracted large attention from several online figures including American blogger and journalist Perez Hilton, American YouTube star Miles Jai, among others. "Party All Night" and its remix by sfpr was released as the album's seventh single on August 27, 2014, and debut remix single. Despite its release, the song failed to enter any music charts. An accompanying music video for the original composition was shot; its features FEMM in a futuristic world and in a small room.

The "Invaderous" remix to "Kill the DJ" was released as the album's eighth single on August 27, 2014, and second remix single. No music video was produced for this remix. "Dead Wrong" was released as the album's ninth single on August 27, 2014. Despite its release, the song failed to enter any music charts. An accompanying music video was shot for the single; its features FEMM wearing traditional Japanese kimono dancing the song in front of computer generated imagery. "Whiplash", alongside two remixes by Invaderous and sfpr, was released as the album's tenth single on September 17, 2014, and third and fourth remix single respectively. Despite its release, the song failed to enter any music charts. An accompanying music video for the original composition was shot; its features FEMM in a black latex uniform, dancing with back-up dancers on a stage. "Unbreakable" was released as the album's eleventh and final single on September 17, 2014. Despite its release, the song failed to enter any music charts. An accompanying music video was shot for the single; its features FEMM singing the song in a white room, whilst sitting near a grand piano.

Live performances and gigs

Femm promoted Femm-Isation on several concert gigs and concerts. FEMM made their debut concert performance at Tokyo's Baamm at Shinkiba. In mid-July 2014, FEMM performed at Tokyo in Tulsa, an anime convention in Oklahoma, which was their first performance in North America. FEMM's second major performance was at Tokyo's newly hosted Twerk 'Em All; this was the host party for FEMM's then-new single "Fxxk Boyz Get Money", along previous material. FEMM were part of a one-night only show for the Japanese leg tour of Dutch recording artist and songwriter Eva Simons, and FEMM performed all the album tracks on their Femm-Isation Vol.3 concert the following day; this gig was hosted at Hatsudai Tamai Hospital. FEMM performed alongside electronic musicians Afrojack, Alesso, Fedde Le Grand, Kaskade, and Martin Garrix amongst others at the annual Ultra Music Festival in Tokyo; this was FEMM's first musical performance at a live festival tour. FEMM performed at the Versace after party in Tokyo, and performed on several other concert gigs until December 2014.

In August 2015, the duo returned to the United States to perform at Rage, a gay bar and dance club in West Hollywood, California. In the same weekend, they were guests at J-Pop Summit in San Francisco along with other Japanese acts such as Eir Aoi, JAM Project, Gacharic Spin and more. The group's final performance promoting material from Femm-Isation was for the 2015 YouTube FanFest Japan, where YouTube personalities and artists gathered together for a live streaming event.

Track listing

All formats
 Digital download – Consists of thirteen original tracks.
 Digital download instrumental set – Consists of thirteen original tracks in instrumental form.
 Double album – Re-released under the title PoW!/LCS + Femm-Isation; Consists ten tracks on one disc, and thirteen tracks from Femm-Isation on the second disc. Includes a bonus t-shirt and poster.

Credits and personnel
Credits adapted from the liner notes of PoW!/LCS + Femm-Isation.

Emily Kaiho – (FEMM band member; RiRi and Honey-B agent); lead vocals, backing vocals
Hiro Todo – (FEMM band member; LuLa and W-Trouble agent); lead vocals, backing vocals
Mark Weinberg – songwriting, producing
Tania Doko – songwriting
Andrew Richard Smith – songwriting, producing
Brian Lee – songwriting, producing
Stuart Critchon – songwriting
Ruby Rose – songwriting
Jorge Mhondera – songwriting
Ben Preston – songwriting, producing
Sofia Toufa – songwriting
Scott Stallone – songwriting, producing
Dan Book – songwriting, producing
Alexei Misoul – songwriting, producing
Leah Haywood – songwriting
Daniel James – songwriting
Christopher Rojas – songwriting, producing
Dreamlab – producing
Evan Bogart – songwriting, producing
Bryan Michael Cox – songwriting, producing

Emanual Kiriakou – songwriting, producing
Brandon Lowery – songwriting, producing
Dan Omelio – songwriting, producing
Andreas Carlsson – songwriting, producing
Markus Bøgelund – songwriting, producing
Danielle Senior – songwriting, producing
Patrick Lukens – songwriting, producing
Nicole Tranquillo – songwriting, producing
Daniel Fält – songwriting
Johannes Jorgensen – songwriting
Grace Tither – songwriting
GL Music – producing
Scott Cutler – songwriting, producing
Anne Preven – songwriting, producing
Priscilla Renea – songwriting, producing
Oliver Goldstein – songwriting, producing
Hideaki Jinbu – mixing, engineer
Tom Coyne – mastering
Invaderous – remixing
Fz – (sfpr member) remixing
Avex Trax – FEMM's record label
Avex Entertainment Inc. – Femm's distribution label

Charts

References

External links
Femm-Isation – FEMM's official website.
Femm-Isation (Instrumental) – FEMM's official website.

2014 debut albums